In statistics, the 68–95–99.7 rule, also known as the empirical rule, is a shorthand used to remember the percentage of values that lie within
an interval estimate in a normal distribution: 68%, 95%, and 99.7% of the values lie within one, two, and three standard deviations of the mean, respectively.

In mathematical notation, these facts can be expressed as follows, where Pr() is the probability function, Χ is an observation from a normally distributed random variable, μ (mu) is the mean of the distribution, and σ (sigma) is its standard deviation:

The usefulness of this heuristic especially depends on the question under consideration. 

In the empirical sciences, the so-called  three-sigma rule of thumb (or 3σ rule) expresses a conventional heuristic that nearly all values are taken to lie within three standard deviations of the mean, and thus it is empirically useful to treat 99.7% probability as near certainty.

In the social sciences, a result may be considered "significant" if its confidence level is of the order of a two-sigma effect (95%), while in particle physics, there is a convention of a five-sigma effect (99.99994% confidence) being required to qualify as a discovery.

A weaker three-sigma rule can be derived from Chebyshev's inequality, stating that even for non-normally distributed variables, at least 88.8% of cases should fall within properly calculated three-sigma intervals. For unimodal distributions, the probability of being within the interval is at least 95% by the Vysochanskij–Petunin inequality. There may be certain assumptions for a distribution that force this probability to be at least 98%.

Cumulative distribution function

These numerical values "68%, 95%, 99.7%" come from the cumulative distribution function of the normal distribution.

The prediction interval for any standard score z corresponds numerically to (1−(1−Φμ,σ2(z))·2).

For example, Φ(2) ≈ 0.9772, or Pr(X ≤ μ + 2σ) ≈ 0.9772, corresponding to a prediction interval of (1 − (1 − 0.97725)·2) = 0.9545 = 95.45%.
This is not a symmetrical interval – this is merely the probability that an observation is less than μ + 2σ. To compute the probability that an observation is within two standard deviations of the mean (small differences due to rounding):

This is related to confidence interval as used in statistics:  is approximately a 95% confidence interval when  is the average of a sample of size .

Normality tests

The "68–95–99.7 rule" is often used to quickly get a rough probability estimate of something, given its standard deviation, if the population is assumed to be normal.  It is also used as a simple test for outliers if the population is assumed normal, and as a normality test if the population is potentially not normal.

To pass from a sample to a number of standard deviations, one first computes the deviation, either the error or residual depending on whether one knows the population mean or only estimates it.  The next step is standardizing (dividing by the population standard deviation), if the population parameters are known, or studentizing (dividing by an estimate of the standard deviation), if the parameters are unknown and only estimated.

To use as a test for outliers or a normality test, one computes the size of deviations in terms of standard deviations, and compares this to expected frequency. Given a sample set, one can compute the studentized residuals and compare these to the expected frequency: points that fall more than 3 standard deviations from the norm are likely outliers (unless the sample size is significantly large, by which point one expects a sample this extreme), and if there are many points more than 3 standard deviations from the norm, one likely has reason to question the assumed normality of the distribution. This holds ever more strongly for moves of 4 or more standard deviations.

One can compute more precisely, approximating the number of extreme moves of a given magnitude or greater by a Poisson distribution, but simply, if one has multiple 4 standard deviation moves in a sample of size 1,000, one has strong reason to consider these outliers or question the assumed normality of the distribution.

For example, a 6σ event corresponds to a chance of about two parts per billion. For illustration, if events are taken to occur daily, this would correspond to an event expected every 1.4 million years.  This gives a simple normality test: if one witnesses a 6σ in daily data and significantly fewer than 1 million years have passed, then a normal distribution most likely does not provide a good model for the magnitude or frequency of large deviations in this respect.

In The Black Swan, Nassim Nicholas Taleb gives the example of risk models according to which the Black Monday crash would correspond to a 36-σ event:
the occurrence of such an event should instantly suggest that the model is flawed, i.e. that the process under consideration is not satisfactorily modeled by a normal distribution. Refined models should then be considered, e.g. by the introduction of stochastic volatility.  In such discussions it is important to be aware of the problem of the gambler's fallacy, which states that a single observation of a rare event does not contradict that the event is in fact rare. It is the observation of a plurality of purportedly rare events that increasingly undermines the hypothesis that they are rare, i.e. the validity of the assumed model. A proper modelling of this process of gradual loss of confidence in a hypothesis would involve the designation of prior probability not just to the hypothesis itself but to all possible alternative hypotheses. For this reason, statistical hypothesis testing works not so much by confirming a hypothesis considered to be likely, but by refuting hypotheses considered unlikely.

Table of numerical values

Because of the exponentially decreasing tails of the normal distribution, odds of higher deviations decrease very quickly. From the rules for normally distributed data for a daily event:

See also
 p-value
 Six Sigma#Sigma levels
 Standard score
 t-statistic

References

External links
 "The Normal Distribution" by Balasubramanian Narasimhan
 "Calculate percentage proportion within x sigmas at WolframAlpha

Normal distribution
Statistical approximations
Rules of thumb

pl:Odchylenie standardowe#Dla rozkładu normalnego